Aleksandr Kharitonov may refer to:
 Aleksandr Kharitonov (politician) (born 1971), Ukrainian politician
 Aleksandr Kharitonov (footballer) (born 1983), Russian footballer
 Aleksandr Kharitonov (ice hockey) (born 1976), Russian ice hockey player
 Alexandr Kharitonov (chess player) (born 1986), Russian chess player